Calgary-East (formally styled Calgary East) is a provincial electoral district in Alberta, Canada. The district is mandated to return a single member to the  Legislative Assembly of Alberta.

Calgary-East has existed twice, the first incarnation was created from Calgary North East in the redistribution of 1963. The riding was abolished in 1971 when it became Calgary-McCall. The return of Calgary-East happened in the 1993 boundary redistribution when Calgary-Forest Lawn and half of Calgary-Millican were merged.

This riding covers the central north east portion of Calgary and contains the neighbourhoods of Vista Heights, Rundle, Marlborough and Mayland Heights.

Three MLAs have held this riding to date. The first Calgary East was represented by Social Credit MLA Albert Ludwig and the second Calgary-East solidly supported Progressive Conservative candidate Moe Amery, until the 2015 Alberta election when the riding was won by NDP candidate Robyn Luff.

History
The original Calgary East electoral district was created in the 1963 boundary redistribution out of Calgary North East. It was abolished in 1971 and split between the new districts of Calgary-McCall and Calgary-Millican. The riding was re-created as Calgary-East in the 1993 boundary redistribution when most of Millican and Calgary-Forest Lawn were merged.

The 2010 boundary redistribution saw the eastern boundary extended east to 68 Street NE into land that was part of old Calgary-Montrose electoral district. The northern boundary cut off all land north of 16 Avenue NE and ceded it to Calgary-Cross. This change also resulted in East picking up some land that had been in old Calgary-North Hill.

Boundary history

Representation history

The first electoral district of Calgary East was created in the boundary redistribution in 1963. The first and only member to represent the old district was Social Credit Member of the Legislative Assembly Albert Ludwig who had been the incumbent in the predecessor riding of Calgary North East.

The 1963 general election saw Ludwig win a super majority taking over 60% of the popular vote. He was re-elected again in the 1967 election winning just over half of the vote. He held the riding until was abolished in 1971.

The second Calgary-East was created in 1993 from a few different riding's. The election in 1993 saw Progressive Conservative candidate Moe Amery defeat former Calgary-Forest Lawn NDP incumbent Barry Pashak to pick up the new district. This was the third time these two candidates had run against each other.

Amery has since been returned to the district four more times.

Legislature results 1963–1971

1963 general election

1967 general election

Election results 1993-present

Senate nominee results

2004 Senate nominee election district results

Voters had the option of selecting 4 Candidates on the Ballot

Student Vote results

2004 election

On November 19, 2004 a Student Vote was conducted at participating Alberta schools to parallel the 2004 Alberta general election results. The vote was designed to educate students and simulate the electoral process for persons who have not yet reached the legal majority. The vote was conducted in 80 of the 83 provincial electoral districts with students voting for actual election candidates. Schools with a large student body that reside in another electoral district had the option to vote for candidates outside of the electoral district then where they were physically located.

2012 election

See also
East Calgary Federal electoral district
East Calgary Northwest Territories territorial electoral district

References

External links 
Electoral Divisions Act 2003
Demographics for Calgary East
Riding Map for Calgary East
Website of the Legislative Assembly of Alberta

Alberta provincial electoral districts
Politics of Calgary